La Poseída (English: The Possessed), is a Chilean telenovela produced, and currently being broadcast, by TVN.

Luciana Echeverría, Marcelo Alonso and Jorge Arecheta star as the main protagonists, while Francisco Melo, Gabriel Cañas and Alicia Rodríguez as the main antagonists.

Cast 
Luciana Echeverría as Carmen Marín
Marcelo Alonso as Raimundo Zisternas
Jorge Arecheta as Gabriel Varas
Amparo Noguera as Sor Juana Correa
Francisco Melo as Eleodoro Mackenna Lyon
Patricia Rivadeneira as Ernestina Riesco
Antonia Zegers as Asunción Mackenna Lyon 
Francisca Gavilán as Rosa Carreño
César Sepúlveda as Joaquín Orrego
Ignacia Baeza as María de los Ángeles Urmeneta
Tiago Correa as Vicente Smith
Daniela Ramírez as Micaela Rojas
Diego Ruiz as Melchor Mackenna
Emilia Noguera as Luisa Mackenna
Óscar Hernández as Bernardo Urmeneta
Taira Court as Sor Beatriz Alemparte
Gabriel Cañas as Pedro Carreño
Magdalena Müller as Adela Soto
Alicia Rodríguez as Vitalia Mackenna
Constanza Contreras as Teresita Cousiño
Camila Roeschmann as Elena Subercaseux
Gabriela Arancibia as Guacolda Paillán
Francisco Ossa as Alfredo Gutiérrez
Agustín Canales as Ignacio Orrego

Special participations 
Hugo Medina as Arzobispo
Pablo Ausensi as Confesor

References 

2015 telenovelas
2015 Chilean television series debuts
2015 Chilean television series endings
2010s Chilean supernatural horror television series
Television shows about spirit possession
Chilean telenovelas
Spanish-language telenovelas
Televisión Nacional de Chile telenovelas